Sticky Fingers is a 1988 film directed by Catlin Adams, who co-wrote the film with Melanie Mayron. The film stars Helen Slater and Mayron.

Premise
Two young, unflappable street musicians are entrusted with a bag of drug money, and immediately set about spending it.  Hijinks and shopping montages ensue.

Cast
Helen Slater as Hattie
Melanie Mayron as Lolly
Adam Shaw as Jean-Marc
Shirley Stoler as Reeba
Danitra Vance as Evanston
Paul Calderon as Speed
Eileen Brennan as Stella
Carol Kane as Kitty
Loretta Devine as Diane
George Buza as Policeman
Stephen McHattie as Eddie
Christopher Guest as Sam
Gwen Welles as Marcie

Reception
Critic reviews were mixed.

References

External links

1988 films
American female buddy films
1980s English-language films
1980s female buddy films
1980s buddy comedy films
American buddy comedy films
Films scored by Gary Chang
1988 directorial debut films
1988 comedy films
1980s American films